The 13th Houston Film Critics Society Awards was held on January 2, 2020 at the Museum of Fine Arts, Houston, Texas, United States. The nominations were announced on December 16, 2019.

Winners and nominees
Winners are listed first and highlighted with boldface.

Multiple nominations and wins

The following films received multiple nominations:

The following films received multiple awards:

References

2019
2019 film awards
2019 in Texas
Houston